Carole da Silva Costa (born 3 May 1990) is a Portuguese footballer who plays as a defender for Benfica and the Portugal women's national football team.

Born in northern Portugal, Carole Costa moved to Germany to play club football in August 2010. She joined Frauen-Bundesliga side SGS Essen where she learned to speak German while playing football.

International goals

Honours
Benfica
 Campeonato Nacional Feminino: 2020–21, 2021–22
 Taça da Liga: 2019–20, 2020–21
 Supertaça de Portugal Feminina: 2022
Sporting
 Campeonato Nacional Feminino: 2017–18
 Taça de Portugal Feminina: 2017–18
 Supertaça de Portugal Feminina: 2017

References

External links 
 
 

1990 births
Living people
Sportspeople from Braga
Portuguese women's footballers
Portugal women's international footballers
Portuguese expatriate sportspeople in Germany
Expatriate women's footballers in Germany
SGS Essen players
MSV Duisburg (women) players
Frauen-Bundesliga players
Women's association football defenders
Campeonato Nacional de Futebol Feminino players
Sporting CP (women's football) players
BV Cloppenburg players
FIFA Century Club
S.L. Benfica (women) footballers
UEFA Women's Euro 2022 players
UEFA Women's Euro 2017 players